Harold John Dickinson (26 November 1911 – 2 June 1997) was a Welsh cricketer.  Dickinson was a right-handed batsman who bowled right-arm fast-medium.  He was born at Barry, Glamorgan.  He was educated in his early years at Barry County Boys School.

Dickinson made his first-class debut for Glamorgan in 1934 against Cambridge University.  From 1934 to 1935, he made 7 first-class appearances, with his final first-class appearance for the county coming against Warwickshire in the 1935 County Championship. In his 7 first-class matches, he scored 37 runs at a batting average of 5.28, with a high score of 14*.  In the field he also took 3 catches With the ball he took 6 wickets at a bowling average of 55.83, with best figures of 3/91.

In the 1935 season, he was offered terms by Glamorgan, but due to the club's modest finances, he instead opted to join the Great Western Railway as a draughtsman. Dickinson died at Hammersmith, London on 2 June 1997.

References

External links
Harold Dickinson at Cricinfo
Harold Dickinson at CricketArchive

1911 births
1997 deaths
Sportspeople from Barry, Vale of Glamorgan
Cricketers from the Vale of Glamorgan
Welsh cricketers
Glamorgan cricketers
People from Hammersmith